Complete Greatest Hits may refer to:

 Complete Greatest Hits (The Cars album), 2002
 Complete Greatest Hits (Foreigner album), 2002
 The Complete Greatest Hits (America album), 2001
 The Very Best Of (Eagles album) (released as The Complete Greatest Hits in the UK, Australia, and New Zealand), 2003